Živojin "Žika" Pavlović (15 April 1933 – 29 November 1998) was a Yugoslav and Serbian film director, writer, painter and professor. In his films and novels, Pavlović depicted the cruel reality of small, poor and abandoned people living in the corners of society. He was one of the major figures of the Black Wave in Yugoslav cinema in 1960s, a movement which portrayed the darker side of life rather than the shiny facades of communist Yugoslavia.

Biography
Pavlović was born in Šabac in 1933. When he was 19, he started writing about film and art for Belgrade newspapers. He graduated in painting at the Academy of Applied Arts, University of Belgrade, and directed his first professional film, Žive Vode (Living Water) in 1961. The film received a special jury award at the Pula Film Festival. He died in Belgrade.

Pavlović received numerous awards, including two NIN Prizes for his novels, Isidora Sekulić Award, one Silver Bear of the Berlin International Film Festival and several Golden Arenas of the Yugoslavia's most prestigious Pula Film Festival.

Filmography

{| class="wikitable sortable"
|-  style="background:#b0c4de; text-align:center;"
! Year
! Film
! Director
! Writer
! Awards / Notes
|-
|1960
|Triptih o materiji i smrti (Triptich on the Matter and Death)
|
|
|Golden Arena at Pula Film Festival
|-
|1961
|Lavirint (Labyrinth)
|
|
|Bronze Arena at Pula Film Festival, Golden Berlin Bear nominee
|-
|1962
|Žive vode (part of Kapi, vode, ratnici)
|
|
|omnibus
|-
|1963
|Obruč (Encirclement; part of Grad)
|
|
|omnibus
|-
|1965
|Neprijatelj (The Enemy)
|
|
|
|-
|1966
|Povratak (The Return)
|
|
|
|-
|1967
|Kad budem mrtav i beo (When I Am Dead and Gone)
|
|
|FIPRESCI Prize at Karlovy Vary International Film Festival, Golden Arena for best film at Pula Film Festival
|-
|1967
|Buđenje pacova (The Rats Woke Up)
|
|
|Golden Arena for Best Director at Pula Film Festival, Silver Bear for Directing in Berlin
|-
|1969
|Zaseda (The Ambush)
|
|
|CIDALC Award at Venice Film Festival
|-
|1970
|Crveno klasje (Red Wheat)
|
|
| Best Film and Best Director at the 1970 Pula Film Festival
|-
|1973
|Let mrtve ptice (Flight of a Dead Bird)
|
|
|
|-
|1975
|Pesma (The Song), TV Series
|
|
|TV series
|-
|1977
|Hajka (Manhunt)
|
|
|Best Film and director at the 1977 Pula Film Festival
|-
|1980
|Nasvidenje v naslednji vojni (See You in the Next War)
|
|
|
|-
|1983
|Body Scent (Zadah tela)
|
|
|Best Film, Director and Screenplay at the 1983 Pula Film Festival
|-
|1987
|Na putu za Katangu (On the Road to Catanga) 
|
|
|
|-
|1992
|Dezerter (The Deserter)
|
|
|
|-
|2000
|Država mrtvih (The State of Dead)
|
|
|post-humous
|-
|}

Bibliography

Short story collections
 Krivudava reka (1963, 1994)
 Dve večeri u jesen (1967)
 Cigansko groblje (1972)
 Ubijao sam bikove (1985, 1988)
 Kriške vremena (1993)
 Blato (1999)
 Dnevnik nepoznatog (1965)
 Vetar u suvoj travi (1976)
 Krugovi (1993)
 Belina sutra (1984)
 Flogiston (1989)
 Azbuka (1990)
Essays
 Film u školskim klupama (1964)
 Đavolji film (1969, 1996)
 O odvratnom (1972, 1982)
 Balkanski džez (1989)
 Davne godine (1997)
Novels
 Lutke; Lutke na bunjištu (1965, 1991)
 Kain i Avelj (1969, 1986)
 Zadah tela (1982, 1985, 1987, 1988, 1990)
 Oni više ne postoje (1985, 1987)
 Zid smrti (1985, 1986, 1987) (NIN Prize)
 Lov na tigrove (1988)
 Raslo mi je badem drvo (1988)
 Vašar na Svetog Aranđela (1990)
 Trag divljači (1991)
 Lapot (1992) (NIN Prize)
 Biljna krv (1995)
 Simetrija (1996)
 Dolap (1997)
Diaries
 Ispljuvak pun krvi (1984 banned, 1990 reissued)
 Otkucaji (1998)
 Dnevnici I-VI'' (2000)

References

External links

 
 
 http://www.filmovi.com/yu/scenaristi/121.shtml 
 Bibliography, Stubovi Kulture publishing company 

Serbian film directors
Serbian writers
1933 births
1998 deaths
People from Šabac
Golden Arena for Best Director winners
Silver Bear for Best Director recipients
Yugoslav film directors